Drobný (feminine Drobná) is a Czech and Slovak surname. It may refer to:

 Emma Drobná (born 1994), Slovak singer
 Jaroslav Drobný (1921–2001), Czech amateur tennis champion and ice hockey player
 Jaroslav Drobný (footballer) (born 1979), Czech international football goalkeeper
 Michal Drobný (born 1934), Slovak politician
 Sheldon Drobny (1945–2020), American accountant and successful investor, formed the company that later became Air America Radio
 Václav Drobný (1980–2012), Czech footballer and central defender

See also
 

Czech-language surnames
Slovak-language surnames